Amphibotettix is an Asian genus of ground-hoppers (Orthoptera: Caelifera) in the subfamily Scelimeninae and the tribe Scelimenini.

Species 
Amphibotettix includes the species:
Amphibotettix abbotti (Rehn, 1904)
Amphibotettix hafizhaii (Mahmood, Idris & Salmah, 2007)
Amphibotettix longipes Hancock, 1906 - type species

References

External links 
 

Tetrigidae
Caelifera genera
Orthoptera of Indo-China